Leslie Archer may refer to:

Leslie Archer (1907–2001), British motorcycle racer
Leslie Archer Jr. (1929–2019), British motorcycle racer, son of Leslie Archer